Alexandr Dolgopolov was the defending champion, but lost to Indian qualifier Somdev Devvarman in the second round.

Juan Martín del Potro won his third Citi Open title and second title of the year, defeating John Isner in the final, 3–6, 6–1, 6–2.

Seeds
All seeds received a bye into the second round.

Draw

Finals

Top half

Section 1

Section 2

Bottom half

Section 3

Section 4

Qualifying

Seeds

Qualifiers

Lucky losers

Qualifying draw

First qualifier

Second qualifier

Third qualifier

Fourth qualifier

Fifth qualifier

Sixth qualifier

References
General

Specific

Citi Open - Men's Singles